The 2012–13 Khuzestan Premier League season was the 13th season of the Khuzestan Premier League which took place from October 3, 2012 to May 16, 2013 with 16 teams competing from the province of Khuzestan. Teams played home and away with one another each playing 30 matches. Farhang Ramhormoz finished the season on top of the standings and was promoted to division 3 of the Iranian football system. Meanwhile, Esteghlal Masjedsoleiman, Esteghlal Hamidieh, and Shahin Hendijan were relegated to the Khuzestan Division 1 league.

Teams 

Source:

Final Standings

See also 

 2012–13 Azadegan League
 2013–14 League 2
 2013–14 League 3
 2012–13 Hazfi Cup
 2013 Iranian Super Cup

References 

Khuzestan Premier League
1
Iran